Lawrencium (103Lr) is a synthetic element, and thus a standard atomic weight cannot be given. Like all synthetic elements, it has no stable isotopes. The first isotope to be synthesized was 258Lr in 1961. There are fourteen known isotopes from 251Lr to 266Lr, and seven isomers. The longest-lived known isotope is 266Lr with a half-life of 11 hours.

List of isotopes 

|-
| rowspan=2|251Lr
| rowspan=2 style="text-align:right" | 103
| rowspan=2 style="text-align:right" | 148
| rowspan=2|251.09418(32)#
| rowspan=2|
| α
| 247Md
| rowspan=2|7/2−
|-
| SF
| (various)
|-
| style="text-indent:1em" | 251mLr
| colspan="3" style="text-indent:2em" | 117(27) keV
| 
| α
| 247Md
| 1/2−
|-
| rowspan=3|252Lr
| rowspan=3 style="text-align:right" | 103
| rowspan=3 style="text-align:right" | 149
| rowspan=3|252.09526(26)#
| rowspan=3|390(90) ms[]
| α (90%)
| 248Md
| rowspan=3|
|-
| β+ (10%)
| 252No
|-
| SF (1%)
| (various)
|-
| rowspan=3|253Lr
| rowspan=3 style="text-align:right" | 103
| rowspan=3 style="text-align:right" | 150
| rowspan=3|253.09509(22)#
| rowspan=3|580(70) ms[]
| α (90%)
| 249Md
| rowspan=3|(7/2−)
|-
| SF (9%)
| (various)
|-
| β+ (1%)
| 253No
|-
| rowspan=2 style="text-indent:1em" | 253mLr
| rowspan=2 colspan="3" style="text-indent:2em" | 30(100)# keV
| rowspan=2 | 2.46(32) s
| α (90%)
| 249Md
| rowspan=2|(1/2−)
|-
| SF (10%)
| (various)
|-
| rowspan=3|254Lr
| rowspan=3 style="text-align:right" | 103
| rowspan=3 style="text-align:right" | 151
| rowspan=3|254.096240(100)
| rowspan=3|12.0(0.9) s
| α (78%)
| 250Md
| rowspan=3|4+#
|-
| β+ (22%)
| 254No
|-
| SF (.1%)
| (various)
|-
| style="text-indent:1em" | 254mLr
| colspan="3" style="text-indent:2em" | 110(6) keV
| 20.3(4.1) s
|
|
| 1+#
|-
| rowspan=3|255Lr
| rowspan=3 style="text-align:right" | 103
| rowspan=3 style="text-align:right" | 152
| rowspan=3|255.096562(19)
| rowspan=3|22(4) s
| α (69%)
| 251Md
| rowspan=3|1/2−
|-
| β+ (30%)
| 255No
|-
| SF (1%)
| (various)
|-
| style="text-indent:1em" | 255m1Lr
| colspan="3" style="text-indent:2em" | 32(2) keV
| 2.54(0.05) s
| α
| 251Md
| (7/2−)
|-
| style="text-indent:1em" | 255m2Lr
| colspan="3" style="text-indent:2em" | 796(12) keV
| <1 μs
| IT
| 255m1Lr
| (15/2+)
|-
| style="text-indent:1em" | 255m3Lr
| colspan="3" style="text-indent:2em" | 1465(12) keV
| 1.78(0.05) ms
| IT
| 255m2Lr
| (25/2+)
|-
| rowspan=3|256Lr
| rowspan=3 style="text-align:right" | 103
| rowspan=3 style="text-align:right" | 153
| rowspan=3|256.09849(9)
| rowspan=3|27(3) s
| α (80%)
| 252Md
| rowspan=3|
|-
| β+ (20%)
| 256No
|-
| SF (.01%)
| (various)
|-
| rowspan=3|257Lr
| rowspan=3 style="text-align:right" | 103
| rowspan=3 style="text-align:right" | 154
| rowspan=3|257.09942(5)#
| rowspan=3|646(25) ms
| α (99.99%)
| 253Md
| rowspan=3|9/2+#
|-
| β+ (.01%)
| 257No
|-
| SF (.001%)
| (various)
|-
| style="text-indent:1em" | 257mLr
| colspan="3" style="text-indent:2em" | 100(50) keV
| 0.27(0.12) s
| 
| 
| 1/2−#
|-
| rowspan=2|258Lr
| rowspan=2 style="text-align:right" | 103
| rowspan=2 style="text-align:right" | 155
| rowspan=2|258.10176(11)#
| rowspan=2|4.1(3) s
| α (95%)
| 254Md
| rowspan=2|
|-
| β+ (5%)
| 258No
|-
| rowspan=3|259Lr
| rowspan=3 style="text-align:right" | 103
| rowspan=3 style="text-align:right" | 156
| rowspan=3|259.10290(8)#
| rowspan=3|6.2(3) s
| α (77%)
| 255Md
| rowspan=3|9/2+#
|-
| SF (23%)
| (various)
|-
| β+ (.5%)
| 259No
|-
| rowspan=3|260Lr
| rowspan=3 style="text-align:right" | 103
| rowspan=3 style="text-align:right" | 157
| rowspan=3|260.10551(13)#
| rowspan=3|2.7 min
| α (75%)
| 256Md
| rowspan=3|
|-
| β+ (15%)
| 260No
|-
| SF (10%)
| (various)
|-
| rowspan=2|261Lr
| rowspan=2 style="text-align:right" | 103
| rowspan=2 style="text-align:right" | 158
| rowspan=2|261.10688(22)#
| rowspan=2|44 min
| SF
| (various)
| rowspan=2|
|-
| α (rare)
| 257Md
|-
| rowspan=2|262Lr
| rowspan=2 style="text-align:right" | 103
| rowspan=2 style="text-align:right" | 159
| rowspan=2|262.10961(22)#
| rowspan=2|216 min
| β+
| 262No
| rowspan=2|
|-
| α (rare)
| 258Md
|-
| 264Lr
| style="text-align:right" | 103
| style="text-align:right" | 161
| 264.11420(47)#
|  h
| SF
| (various)
| 
|-
| 266Lr
| style="text-align:right" | 103
| style="text-align:right" | 163
| 266.11983(56)#
| 11 h
| SF
| (various)
|
|-

Nucleosynthesis

Cold fusion
205Tl(50Ti,xn)255−xLr (x=2)
This reaction was studied in a series of experiments in 1976 by Yuri Oganessian and his team at the FLNR. Evidence was provided for the formation of 253Lr in the 2n exit channel. In 2022, two states (253Lr and 253mLr) were found.

203Tl(50Ti,xn)253−xLr (x=2)
This reaction was studied in a series of experiments in 1976 by Yuri Oganessian and his team at the FLNR. In 2022, two states (251Lr and 251mLr) were found.

208Pb(48Ti,pxn)255−xLr (x=1?)
This reaction was reported in 1984 by Yuri Oganessian at the FLNR. The team was able to detect decays of 246Cf, a descendant of 254Lr.

208Pb(45Sc,xn)253−xLr
This reaction was studied in a series of experiments in 1976 by Yuri Oganessian and his team at the FLNR. Results are not readily available.

209Bi(48Ca,xn)257−xLr (x=2)
This reaction has been used to study the spectroscopic properties of 255Lr. The team at GANIL used the reaction in 2003 and the team at the FLNR used it between 2004–2006 to provide further information for the decay scheme of 255Lr. The work provided evidence for an isomeric level in 255Lr.

Hot fusion
243Am(18O,xn)261−xLr (x=5)
This reaction was first studied in 1965 by the team at the FLNR. They were able to detect activity with a characteristic decay of 45 seconds, which was assigned to256Lr or 257Lr. Later work suggests an assignment to 256Lr. Further studies in 1968 produced an 8.35–8.60 MeV alpha activity with a half-life of 35 seconds. This activity was also initially assigned to 256Lr or 257Lr and later to solely 256Lr.

243Am(16O,xn)259−xLr (x=4)
This reaction was studied in 1970 by the team at the FLNR. They were able to detect an 8.38 MeV alpha activity with a half-life of 20s. This was assigned to255Lr.

248Cm(15N,xn)263−xLr (x=3,4,5)
This reaction was studied in 1971 by the team at the LBNL in their large study of lawrencium isotopes. They were able to assign alpha activities to260Lr,259Lr and 258Lr from the 3-5n exit channels.

248Cm(18O,pxn)265−xLr (x=3,4)
This reaction was studied in 1988 at the LBNL in order to assess the possibility of producing 262Lr and 261Lr without using the exotic 254Es target. It was also used to attempt to measure an electron capture (EC) branch in 261mRf from the 5n exit channel.
After extraction of the Lr(III) component, they were able to measure the spontaneous fission of 261Lr with an improved half-life of 44 minutes. The production cross-section was 700 pb. On this basis, a 14% electron capture branch was calculated if this isotope was produced via the 5n channel rather than the p4n channel.
A lower bombarding energy (93 MeV c.f. 97 MeV) was then used to measure the production of 262Lr in the p3n channel. The isotope was successfully detected and a yield of 240 pb was measured. The yield was lower than expected compared to the p4n channel. However, the results were judged to indicate that the 261Lr was most likely produced by a p3n channel and an upper limit of 14% for the electron capture branch of 261mRf was therefore suggested.

246Cm(14N,xn)260−xLr (x=3?)
This reaction was studied briefly in 1958 at the LBNL using an enriched 244Cm target (5% 246Cm). They observed a ~9 MeV alpha activity with a half-life of ~0.25 seconds. Later results suggest a tentative assignment to 257Lr from the 3n channel

244Cm(14N,xn)258−xLr
This reaction was studied briefly in 1958 at the LBNL using an enriched 244Cm target (5% 246Cm). They observed a ~9 MeV alpha activity with a half-life of ~0.25s. Later results suggest a tentative assignment to 257Lr from the 3n channel with the 246Cm component. No activities assigned to reaction with the 244Cm component have been reported.

249Bk(18O,αxn)263−xLr (x=3)
This reaction was studied in 1971 by the team at the LBNL in their large study of lawrencium isotopes. They were able to detect an activity assigned to 260Lr. The reaction was further studied in 1988 to study the aqueous chemistry of lawrencium. A total of 23 alpha decays were measured for 260Lr, with a mean energy of 8.03 MeV and an improved half-life of 2.7 minutes. The calculated cross-section was 8.7 nb.

252Cf(11B,xn)263−xLr (x=5,7??)
This reaction was first studied in 1961 at the University of California by Albert Ghiorso by using a californium target (52% 252Cf). They observed three alpha activities of 8.6, 8.4 and 8.2 MeV, with half-lives of about 8 and 15 seconds, respectively. The 8.6 MeV activity was tentatively assigned to 257Lr. Later results suggest a reassignment to 258Lr, resulting from the 5n exit channel. The 8.4 MeV activity was also assigned to 257Lr. Later results suggest a reassignment to 256Lr. This is most likely from the 33% 250Cf component in the target rather than from the 7n channel. The 8.2 MeV was subsequently associated with nobelium.

252Cf(10B,xn)262−xLr (x=4,6)
This reaction was first studied in 1961 at the University of California by Albert Ghiorso by using a californium target (52% 252Cf). They observed three alpha activities of 8.6, 8.4 and 8.2 MeV, with half-lives of about 8 and 15 seconds, respectively. The 8.6 MeV activity was tentatively assigned to 257Lr. Later results suggest a reassignment to 258Lr. The 8.4 MeV activity was also assigned to 257Lr. Later results suggest a reassignment to 256Lr. The 8.2 MeV was subsequently associated with nobelium.

250Cf(14N,αxn)260−xLr (x=3)
This reaction was studied in 1971 at the LBNL. They were able to identify a 0.7s alpha activity with two alpha lines at 8.87 and 8.82 MeV. This was assigned to257Lr.

249Cf(11B,xn)260−xLr (x=4)
This reaction was first studied in 1970 at the LBNL in an attempt to study the aqueous chemistry of lawrencium. They were able to measure a Lr3+ activity. The reaction was repeated in 1976 at Oak Ridge and 26s 256Lr was confirmed by measurement of coincident X-rays.

249Cf(12C,pxn)260−xLr (x=2)
This reaction was studied in 1971 by the team at the LBNL. They were able to detect an activity assigned to 258Lr from the p2n channel.

249Cf(15N,αxn)260−xLr (x=2,3)
This reaction was studied in 1971 by the team at the LBNL. They were able to detect an activities assigned to 258Lr and 257Lr from the α2n and α3n and channels. The reaction was repeated in 1976 at Oak Ridge and the synthesis of 258Lr was confirmed.

254Es + 22Ne – transfer
This reaction was studied in 1987 at the LLNL. They were able to detect new spontaneous fission (SF) activities assigned to 261Lr and 262Lr, resulting from transfer from the 22Ne nuclei to the 254Es target. In addition, a 5 ms SF activity was detected in delayed coincidence with nobelium K-shell X-rays and was assigned to 262No, resulting from the electron capture of 262Lr.

Decay products
Isotopes of lawrencium have also been identified in the decay of heavier elements. Observations to date are summarised in the table below:

Isotopes

Fourteen isotopes of lawrencium plus seven isomers have been synthesized with 266Lr being the longest-lived and the heaviest, with a half-life of 11 hours. 251Lr is the lightest isotope of lawrencium to be produced to date.

Lawrencium-253 isomers
A study of the decay properties of 257Db (see dubnium) in 2001 by Hessberger et al. at the GSI provided some data for the decay of 253Lr. Analysis of the data indicated the population of two isomeric levels in 253Lr from the decay of the corresponding isomers in 257Db. The ground state was assigned spin and parity of 7/2−, decaying by emission of an 8794 keV alpha particle with a half-life of 0.57 s. The isomeric level was assigned spin and parity of 1/2−, decaying by emission of an 8722 keV alpha particle with a half-life of 1.49 s.

Lawrencium-255 isomers
Recent work on the spectroscopy of 255Lr formed in the reaction 209Bi(48Ca,2n)255Lr has provided evidence for an isomeric level.

References 

 Isotope masses from:

 Isotopic compositions and standard atomic masses from:

 Half-life, spin, and isomer data selected from the following sources.

 
Lawrencium
Lawrencium